Råholt is a village in the municipality of Eidsvoll, Norway. Its population (2017) is 13 156, of which 259 people live within the border of the neighboring municipality Ullensaker.

Råholt has experienced growth following the airport at Gardermoen, and expansion still takes place.

External links

Villages in Akershus